Coleophora crassicornella is a moth of the family Coleophoridae that is endemic to Algeria.

The larvae feed on Atriplex halimus. They feed on the leaves of their host plant.

References

External links

crassicornella
Moths of Africa
Endemic fauna of Algeria
Moths described in 1915